Mondesir Alladjim (born 10 February 1986) is a Chadian football defender who currently plays for Renaissance. He is also a member of Chad national football team where he plays centre-back position. He has 12 caps for national team and was a part of qualifying campaign for 2010 World Cup, as well as 2012 Africa Cup of Nations.

References

External links 

1986 births
Living people
Chadian footballers
Chad international footballers
People from N'Djamena
Association football defenders